The Hawaii Stars were an independent professional baseball team based out of Hilo, Hawaii.  They were charter members of the Pacific Association of Professional Baseball Clubs.  They played their home games at Wong Stadium in Hilo and competed along with the Na Koa Ikaika Maui, San Rafael Pacifics, and Vallejo Admirals.  They were also members of the North American League before that league folded in 2012. The Stars were managed by Garry Templeton Jr. son of former Major League All-Star Garry Templeton.   

During the 2013 season the Stars played 12 games against the Japanese independent Baseball Challenge League. To start the season, Hilo hosted two three games series against the Shinano Grandserows and Ishikawa Million Stars. In late July, the Stars traveled to Japan to play six games, one game each against Gunma Diamond Pegasus, Niigata Albirex Baseball Club, Shinano Grandserows, Fukui Miracle Elephants, Toyama Thunderbirds and Ishikawa Million Stars.

The team shut down operations after playing the 2013 Pacific Association season due to the travel costs of bringing in the teams from Northern California.

Season-by-season results

Notable alumni

 Dane Sardinha (2013)
 Onan Masaoka (2013)

References

External links
 Official website

Pacific Association of Professional Baseball Clubs teams
North American League teams
Professional baseball teams in Hawaii
Defunct baseball teams in Hawaii
2012 establishments in Hawaii
2013 disestablishments in Hawaii
Defunct independent baseball league teams
Baseball teams established in 2012
Baseball teams disestablished in 2013